Nikolai Kabanov, born 1980) is a Russian chess grandmaster.

Career
Kabanov represented Russia 3 in the 39th Chess Olympiad in 2010, where he finished on 1.5 out of 4.

Kabanov qualified for the Chess World Cup 2011, where he was defeated by David Navara in the first round.

References

External links

Nikolai Kabanov chess games at 365Chess.com

1980 births
Living people
Chess grandmasters
Russian chess players